The Macintosh Quadra 650, originally sold as the Macintosh Centris 650, is a personal computer designed, manufactured and sold by Apple Computer from February 1993 to September 1994. The Centris 650 was introduced alongside the smaller Centris 610 as the replacement for the Macintosh IIci and Quadra 700, and it was intended as the start of the new midrange Centris line of computers. Later in 1993, Apple decided to follow an emerging industry trend of naming product families for their target customers – Quadra for business, LC for education, and Performa for home – and folded the Centris 650 into the Quadra family.

The Quadra 650 was discontinued without a direct replacement in September 1994, although the recently introduced Power Macintosh 7100, which has the same IIvx form factor as the 650, had a similar target audience and was sold in the same price range.

Models 

There are two versions of the Centris 650: One with 4 MB of RAM soldered to the logic board and an FPU-less Motorola 68LC040 CPU, and one with 8 MB of logic board RAM, a full Motorola 68040, and an onboard AAUI port for Ethernet. Each can be configured with a 80 MB,  230 MB, or 500 MB 3.5-inch hard drive. Standard equipment on all Centris 650 models includes onboard video (with VGA support via an adapter), 3 NuBus slots, a Processor Direct Slot, two ADB and two serial ports, an external SCSI connector, and a 5.25-inch drive bay. There are four SIMM slots that support 4, 8, 16, and 32 MB SIMMs, allowing for a maximum of 132 or 136 MB of RAM depending on the amount of soldered memory. System 7.1 was included as standard and is the minimum required version.

The higher-end model also came with 1MB VRAM installed, enabling 16-bit color at 640x480 resolution. The availability of 16-bit color was significant, as it was the standard bit depth of Apple's then-new QuickTime video standard.

As a way to promote the use of multimedia, Apple also sold a Centris 650 "CD ROM bundle", which had 8 MB of RAM and 1 MB of video RAM, and included a microphone, an AppleCD 300i CD-ROM drive, and a System 7 install CD.

Introduced February 10, 1993:
 Macintosh Centris 650: Sold in five configurations:
 25 MHz 68LC040, 4 MB RAM (onboard), 512 KB VRAM, 80 MB HDD, no Ethernet
 25 MHz 68040, 8 MB RAM (onboard), 512 KB VRAM, 80 MB HDD, Ethernet
 25 MHz 68040, 8 MB RAM (onboard), 512 KB VRAM, 230 MB HDD, Ethernet
 25 MHz 68040, 8 MB RAM (onboard), 1 MB VRAM, 230 MB HDD, Ethernet, AppleCD 300i and microphone
 25 MHz 68040, 24 MB RAM (including 8 MB onboard), 1 MB VRAM, 500 MB HDD, Ethernet

Introduced October 21, 1993:
 Macintosh Quadra 650: 33 MHz 68040.

Timeline

References

External links 

 Centris 650 and Quadra 650 at apple-history.com
 Centris 650 and Quadra 650 at Low End Mac
 Centris 650 and Quadra 650 at EveryMac.com

650
650
Quadra 650
Quadra 650
Quadra 650
Computer-related introductions in 1993